Fifth Lake is a lake located by Inlet, New York. It is part of the Fulton Chain Lakes. The inlet is connected to Sixth Lake by a creek and the outlet is connected to Fourth Lake by a channel. Fish species present in the lake are brown trout, lake trout, smelt, rainbow trout, black bullhead, yellow perch, and pumpkinseed sunfish. There is access via a channel from Fourth Lake.

References

Lakes of New York (state)
Lakes of Hamilton County, New York